The flag of Saint Lucia consists of a cerulean blue field charged with a yellow triangle in front of a white-edged black isosceles triangle. Adopted in 1967 to replace the British Blue Ensign defaced with the arms of the colony, it has been the flag of Saint Lucia since the country became an associated state of the United Kingdom that year. Although the overall design of the flag has remained unchanged, specific aspects of it have been altered over the years.

History
The French colonised Saint Lucia in 1635 and subsequently signed a treaty with the local indigenous population 25 years later in 1660. However, the British vied for control with the French, and the island frequently switched hands between the two powers. This continued until 1814, when the Treaty of Paris was signed that saw France permanently relinquish Saint Lucia to the British, and it became a crown colony of the United Kingdom within its colonial empire in that same year. During this colonial period of French and British rule, Saint Lucia did not have its own unique colonial flag.

The British finally granted Saint Lucia its own unique coat of arms in August 1939. The escutcheon consisted of a black shield featuring two sticks of bamboo forming a cross, with two Tudor roses symbolising England and two fleurs-de-lis symbolising France occupying the four quadrants. This emblem was utilised to deface the British Blue Ensign in order to form the territory's flag.

The island became part of the West Indies Federation from 1958 to 1962. However, this political union turned out to be unsuccessful, and on 1 March 1967 – five years after the federation was dissolved – Saint Lucia became an Associated State. This gave the territory full control over domestic matters, while Britain retained responsibility for the island's foreign affairs and defence. The territory's new flag, which was designed by native Saint Lucian artist Dunstan St Omer, was adopted on that same day. When Saint Lucia became an independent country on 22 February 1979, the overall design of the flag from twelve years before remained unchanged, but the blue colour's shade and the triangles' sizes were modified marginally. Despite the fact that the island already had its own distinct flag by the time it became a sovereign state, the Union Jack was still lowered for the final time at the official ceremony marking independence.

Design

The colours and symbols of the flag carry cultural, political, and regional meanings. The blue epitomises the sky and the sea, specifically the Atlantic Ocean and Caribbean Sea which encircle the country. The black and white allude to the harmonious relationship between the black and white races. The yellow symbolises the sunshine, as well as prosperity. The triangles represent the Pitons, which are twin volcanic cones located in the southwest part of the island and unity; Gros Piton and Petit Piton are a national symbol of Saint Lucia.

Historical flags

References

External links

 
  Code of Etiquette for the use of the National Flag of Saint Lucia
 The Flag of Saint Lucia information from the Government of Saint Lucia
 Saint Lucia Flag at World Flags 101

Flags introduced in 1967
Flag
National flags